Methyl cyanoformate is the organic compound with the formula CH3OC(O)CN.  It is used as a reagent in organic synthesis as a source of the methoxycarbonyl group, in which context it is also known as Mander's reagent.  When a lithium enolate is generated in diethyl ether or methyl t-butyl ether, treatment with Mander's reagent will selectively afford the C-acylation product.  Thus, for enolate acylation reactions in which C- vs. O-selectivity is a concern, methyl cyanoformate is often used in place of more common acylation reagent like methyl chloroformate.

Methyl cyanoformate is also an ingredient in Zyklon A. It has lachrymatory effects.

References

Methyl esters
Carboxylate esters
Reagents for organic chemistry
Nitriles
Fumigants
Blood agents
Lachrymatory agents